The Ansaldo armored car was a prototype built by Ansaldo in 1925, based on a Pavesi heavy tractor.

Design
The prototype was armed with a 45 mm cannon in a turret. It had 4 wheels with  diameter.

Operators

See also

 Vehicles of comparable role and era
 Lancia IZM

References

Notes

Bibliography

External links
 "Italian Experimental Tanks" page - Tanks! website (accessed 2014-01-21)

Gio. Ansaldo & C. armored vehicles
Armoured cars of Italy
Armoured cars of the interwar period
Military vehicles introduced in the 1920s